The Mystery of Three Quarters is a work of detective fiction by Sophie Hannah. It is the third in her series of Hercule Poirot novels, after being authorised by the estate of Agatha Christie to write new stories for the character. The previous two are The Monogram Murders (2014) and Closed Casket (2016).

Plot
Four people receive letters purporting to be from Hercule Poirot and accusing them each of the murder of Barnabas Pandy, a ninety-something businessman who drowned - accidentally, it seems - in his bath. Poirot has no knowledge of the letters, nor yet of the late Barnabas Pandy, until he is accosted by one of the recipients, society woman Sylvia Rule, before finding another, market trader John McCrodden, in his drawing room. As he begins to investigate the source of the letters with assistance from his young friend Edward Catchpool, a Scotland Yard detective, he comes into contact with the family of Pandy, which seems to be hiding secrets.

Explanation of the novel's title
Poirot refers to the case as "the mystery of three quarters" because, of the four people who received letters purporting to be from him, three are in some way connected to the late Barnabas Pandy, whose murder the letters accuse each one of. The fourth, however, is seemingly unconnected. Poirot, then, must figure out the relevance of the fourth person, or quarter. To symbolise the four quarters Poirot uses a slice of Church Window Cake, whose fourth square is separated from the other three.

Characters

Main characters 
Hercule Poirot, private detective
Edward Catchpool, inspector from Scotland Yard

Recipients of the letters
Hugo Dockerill, housemaster to Pandy's great-grandson
John McCrodden, seemingly unconnected to Pandy
Sylvia Rule, mother of a boy in the same school house as Pandy's great-grandson
Annabel Treadway, Barnabas Pandy's granddaughter

Other characters
Kingsbury, Pandy's butler and closest friend
Ivy Lavington, Treadway's niece
Lenore Lavington, Ivy's mother
Timothy Lavington, Lenore's son
Rowland "Rope" McCrodden, John's father, a solicitor nicknamed "Rowland Rope" due to his preference for capital punishment
Freddy Rule, Sylvia's son and Timothy's classmate
Mildred Rule, Sylvia's daughter

References

External links
The Mystery of Three Quarters on the official Sophie Hannah website
The Mystery of Three Quarters on the official Agatha Christie website

2018 British novels
HarperCollins books
Hercule Poirot novels